Badarwas is a town and a nagar panchayat in Shivpuri district  in the state of Madhya Pradesh, India. Badarwas is also known as Jacket Capital of India.

Geography
It has an average elevation of 471 metres (1,545 feet).

Demographics
 India census, Badarwas had a population of 10,408. Males constitute 52% of the population and females 48%. Badarwas has an average literacy rate of 62%, higher than the national average of 59.5%; with 61% of the males and 39% of females literate. 17% of the population is under 6 years of age.

Transport
Badarwas railway station is situated at Badarwas on Indore–Gwalior line under the Bhopal railway division. The nearest airport is Gwalior.

References

Shivpuri